Paul Kawanga Ssemogerere (11 February 1932 – 18 November 2022) was a Ugandan politician who was the leader of the Democratic Party for 25 years, and one of the main players in Ugandan politics until his retirement in 2005.

Early life and education
Ssemogerere was born on 11 February 1932, in the Buganda Region (present-day Kalangala District) of Uganda. He attended St. Henry's College Kitovu for his high school. He received a Diploma in Education from Makerere University in Kampala. He studied the Politics and Government Program at Allegheny College in Meadville, Pennsylvania. In 1979 he obtained a Doctor of Philosophy (PhD) degree in public administration from Syracuse University in Syracuse, New York.

Political career
From 1961 to 1962 Ssemogerere was elected as a member of the Uganda Legislative Council, and afterwards of the National Assembly of Uganda as Member of Parliament for North Mengo Constituency. In 1972, he replaced Benedicto Kiwanuka as the leader of the Democratic Party, having previously served as his Parliamentary Secretary. Following the 1971 coup, Ssemogerere was in exile until 1979, when he returned as Minister of Labour.

In 1980, Paul Ssemogerere assumed leadership of the Democratic Party. In 1984, he was reelected as leader over the challenge of Okeny Atwoma. In response to Okeny Atwoma's unsuccessful challenge, Atwoma established the Nationalist Liberal Party alongside former minister Anthony Ochaya, Cuthbert Joseph Obwangor, and Francis Bwenge.

Ssemogerere was a Presidential Candidate in the disputed 1980 General elections which were won by Milton Obote's Uganda People's Congress. Ssemogerere then became the leader of the parliamentary opposition from 1981 to 1985. He was appointed Minister of Internal Affairs during the presidency of Tito Okello (1985–86). 

After Yoweri Museveni became president in January 1986 following a coup, Ssemogerere was consecutively Minister of Internal Affairs (1986–88), Foreign Affairs (1988–94) and Public Service (1994–95) and at the same time held the post of deputy prime minister in Museveni's National Resistance Movement government (from 1986). He resigned from his government posts in June 1995 because he was the presidential candidate for the mainstream opposition, but he lost the 1996 presidential elections to Museveni.

Ssemogerere was also a delegate to the Organisation for African Unity (OAU), and was chairman of the OAU Council of Ministers from 1993 to 1994. 

After his retirement from politics in November 2005, he was succeeded as party president by John Ssebaana Kizito, the mayor of Kampala at that time.

Personal life and death
Ssemogerere was married to Germina Namatovu Ssemogerere, a professor of economics at Makerere University. Their children include Grace Nabatanzi (1963–2011), who married Gerald Ssendaula; Karoli Ssemogerere, an American-trained lawyer; Anna Namakula, a public policy analyst with the Foundation for African Development, Immaculate Kibuuka, a fashion designer; and Paul Semakula an ICT Consultant. He was a member of the Roman Catholic religion.

Ssemogerere died on 18 November 2022, at the age of 90.

Political timeline
1961–62 Parliamentary Secretary to Chief Minister Benedicto Kiwanuka
1963–69 Publicity Secretary Democratic Party
1979–81 Member National Consultative Council
1981–85 Leader of the Official Opposition
1984–94 Vice President Christian Democratic International
1985–88 Minister of Internal Affairs
1988–90 Chair OAU Council of Ministers
1988–94 Second Deputy Prime Minister and Minister of Foreign and Regional Affairs
1994–95 Second Deputy Prime Minister and Minister of Public Service
1999      Brought the first of 5 landmark cases that outlawed the Movement System and set stage for return of Political Parties to Uganda.
2005      Retired as DP President to private business.
2011      Honored as Sabasaba 2011 by Sabasaba Flame Award, for being an all time pro-Democracy and peace politician

See also 
Politics of Uganda

References

External links
Dr. Paul Kawanga Ssemogerere profile at Österreichs Bundesheer

1932 births
2022 deaths
Ganda people
Foreign Ministers of Uganda
Members of the Parliament of Uganda
Democratic Party (Uganda) politicians
Allegheny College alumni
Leaders of the Opposition (Uganda)
Syracuse University alumni
People from Central Region, Uganda
Makerere University alumni
Leaders of political parties in Uganda